DEZ refers to:
 Deir ez-Zor Airport, airport code
 diethylzinc, a reagent in chemistry